Acleris glaucomis is a species of moth of the family Tortricidae. It is found in India (Assam).

References

Moths described in 1908
glaucomis
Moths of Asia